Maliszewo-Perkusy  is a village in the administrative district of Gmina Zawady, within Białystok County, Podlaskie Voivodeship, in north-eastern Poland.

The village has a population of 105.

References

Maliszewo-Perkusy